Darren Harris (born 20 June 1973) is a dual Paralympian, and England's most capped and most decorated blind footballer. Outside of sports he is a number one bestselling author, motivational speaker and transformational coach.

Early life 
Darren Harris was born in Wolverhampton on 20 June 1973. Following a life-changing diagnosis of bilateral retinoblastoma by a Harley Street specialist aged 15 months, his sight deteriorated until he became completely blind in his 20s.

Harris went to New College Worcester as his sight continued to deteriorate. According to him, it was an extremely challenging time and he was picking fights constantly. He found some solace in sports, especially football, which gave him focus and direction.

Harris studied Mathematics at the University of Sheffield and worked in the IT sector for nine years, first with British Steel in 1995 and then Capgemini in 1998.

Professional sports career

Football (1996-2007)  
Harris made his debut for the England blind football team in 1996, became captain in 2002, and won medals in six consecutive European Championships: Barcelona in 1997, Porto in 1999, Paris in 2001, Manchester in 2003, Malaga in 2005, and Athens in 2007.

The team qualified a place at the Paralympic Games in Athens 2004 but they were barred from taking part, as the other Home Nations besides England wouldn't sanction a Great Britain team to play.

Frustrated and deeply disillusioned by the lack of professionalism and politics surrounding the blind football setup, he decided to switch sports to Judo. Before making that shift he helped Great Britain qualify for the 2008 Beijing Paralympics. He then gave up football in order to focus full time on Judo.

Judo (2004-2011) 
Harris represented Great Britain in judo at the Paralympic Games in Beijing 2008 in the -66 kg weight category. He lost in the first round to the world champion and eventual Paralympic bronze medallist Victor Sanchez from Cuba.

He picked up Judo while he was still at school, was awarded his black belt in 2001, but by his own admission, it was purely recreational until he couldn’t compete in the 2004 Paralympics with the Great Britain football team.

He trained under Russian judo coach Valeriy Vostrikov and alongside sighted judokas such as Craig Fallon, which he admits helped him qualify for the 2008 Beijing Games.

Either side of the Games, he won medals at the European Championships; silver in Baku in 2007, and bronze in Budapest in 2009. However, his World Championships in 2010 and World Games in 2011 were plagued by injury and he decided to retire from Judo.

Return to football (2011–2019) 
Harris represented Great Britain in football at the Paralympic Games in London 2012. During the group stages they drew 1-1 with Spain and 0-0 with Argentina. They then lost 1-0 to Iran in a must-win game to make it through to the semi-finals.

Harris won bronze at the European Championships in Aksaray in 2011, silver at the World Games in Seoul in 2015 and bronze at the European Championships in Berlin in 2017.

He has made 162 appearances, scored 34 goals, and won ten World and European medals to date.

Domestic honours 
Harris was awarded an Albion Foundation Star for his 'Outstanding Contribution to WBA Teams'. He won the League and the Cup trophies three times each and the Golden Boot five times, cementing his reputation as one of the world’s best strikers in blind football.

Present ventures 
Darren is currently a motivational speaker and transformational coach who helps people live a life without limits.

According to him, being a coach was the next thing for him to do organically because he has always been a mentor since his early playing days and latterly, with different organisations such as Dame Kelly Holmes Trust. He is also a regular speaker all over England.

Philanthropy 
Harris was awarded an honorary degree by the Open University for his 'outstanding contribution to public services'. He is the patron of the Childhood Eye Cancer Trust and has been an ambassador for a number of other charitable organisations. He has also been involved in various fundraising feats including the Vision Express, Ride4Sight and Tri Albion Challenge.

Personal life 
Harris has an estranged relationship with his father and by his own admission, has not been in touch with him for decades. He met Ivy in 2011 and married her on 12 September 2015. They welcomed their first-born Devante on 7 January 2017.

References 

http://www.rsbc.org.uk/blogs/blind-footballer-and-paralympian-darren-harris-retires/

https://www.expressandstar.com/sport/west-bromwich-albion-fc/2015/10/21/albion-try-blind-and-power-chair-football/found-24-ts-20/

http://www.birminghammail.co.uk/news/health/sutton-coldfield-paralympian-how-sport-7053011

Paralympic judoka of Great Britain
1973 births
Living people